Carreg Cennen Castle (Welsh: Castell Carreg Cennen) is a castle sited on a high rocky outcrop overlooking the River Cennen, close to the village of Trap, four miles south east of Llandeilo in Carmarthenshire, Wales. Castell Carreg Cennen means castle on a rock next to (the river) Cennen, the river name itself being a reference either to cen meaning lichen or perhaps a personal name.

The dramatic limestone precipice was originally the site of a native Welsh castle, possibly constructed by The Lord Rhys, although any remains of this castle have been subsumed by later English work. In 1277, during the conquest of Wales by Edward I, the English gained control of the castle. It was briefly retaken by Welsh forces in 1282, but was back under English control by the following year, when it was granted to the English baron John Giffard. The castle was unsuccessfully besieged by Owain Glyndŵr during the Welsh Revolt. During the Wars of the Roses it was surrendered to the Yorkists and slighted in 1462 to prevent further use.

The castle visible today was probably constructed by John Giffard and his son John. It is situated within the Brecon Beacons National Park and is now in the care of Cadw, the Welsh Government historic environment service.

Description 
Carreg Cennen Castle consists of a strongly-walled and towered square court. There are six towers, all of different shapes, including a great twin-towered gatehouse on the north side. A range of apartments on the east side of the inner court, or ward, includes a hall, kitchens, chapel, and the so-called 'King's Chamber'. This chamber has a well-carved stone fireplace, and traceried windows, one facing into the courtyard, the other outwards commanding impressive views to the south. These date from the late 13th or early 14th century.

The castle is protected by limestone cliffs to the south and rock-cut ditches to the west.  To the north and east there is an outer ward, and within that a barbican, gatehouse. Three drawbridges over deep pits protected the access to the inner ward. In the south-east corner of the inner ward steps lead to a vaulted passage and a natural cave beneath the castle, which leads deep into the hillside.  A freshwater spring rises in the cave, which would have been a useful supplement during dry weather when the castle would have had difficulty harvesting rainwater in filling the rainwater cisterns. The castle is under the care of Cadw, who have stabilised and, to a limited extent, restored some of the remains. The castle is accessed via a steep climb up the hill from Castell Farm, which is near the car park. A large threshing barn has been converted to tearooms and a shop, whilst the majority of the farm buildings, around a traditional farmyard, retain their agricultural purposes. Since 1982 these have been part of a farm park with rare and unusual breeds of cows and sheep.
This castle did not have a keep as such; the gatehouse acted as the castle's keep because this was the tallest part of the Castell Carreg.

Geology 

The Carreg Cennen Disturbance, a zone of ancient geological faults and folds stretching from Pembrokeshire to Shropshire, gains its name from this location where it is most impressively revealed. The rocky outcrop on which the castle is perched is an isolated block of Carboniferous Limestone trapped within two faults which form a part of the disturbance. In contrast, the immediately surrounding countryside is underlain by Old Red Sandstone. This disturbance is probably also responsible for the alignment of the Afon Cennen to the west of this location where the river follows the line of the fault for over 2.5 mi / 4 km because firstly glaciers during the Ice Age then more recently the river have found it easier to erode these deformed rocks.

Prehistoric evidence 
Human remains found in a cave inside the limestone rock date human activity here back to prehistoric times. The site may well have also been an Iron Age hillfort.

Roman coins from the 1st and 2nd century have also been found, although it is unlikely the Romans occupied this site on a permanent basis.

Welsh period 

The first masonry castle was probably built by The Lord Rhys, and remained a possession of the Deheubarth dynasty for the next 50 years. The earliest documented mention of the castle is 1248, when Brut y Tywysogion records that Rhys Fychan ap Rhys Mechyll's mother Matilda de Braose, to spite her son, granted the castle to the Norman English, but before the English took possession of it Rhys captured the castle.

For the next 30 years it changed hands frequently between Rhys and his uncle Maredudd, who were fighting for control of the Kingdom of Deheubarth. In 1277, at the start of the conquest of Wales by Edward I, the Welsh lords of the region sided with Edward against the Welsh leader Llywelyn ap Gruffudd and the castle was handed over to the English. In 1282, a second phase of fighting began and the local Welsh nobles switched sides, joining the widespread Welsh rebellion and seizing control of the castle. By the following year it was back in English hands.

English period 
In 1283 Edward I granted the castle to John Giffard, the commander of the English troops at Cilmeri where Llywelyn ap Gruffudd was killed. Giffard was probably responsible for the remodelled castle we see today; reconstruction occurred in phases, and it is likely the work was completed under his son, John.

Rhys ap Maredudd briefly captured Carreg Cennen during a rebellion against English rule in 1287, although he did not retain control of the castle for long.

Glyndŵr rebellion 

In early July 1403 Owain Glyndŵr, together with 800 men, attacked Carreg Cennen, but, although inflicting severe damage to the walls, failed to take the castle.  It was defended against Glyndwr's forces, who laid siege to it for several months, with Owain himself present, by a man who was to marry one of Glyndwr's daughters just a few years later, Sir John Scudamore of Herefordshire.

Wars of the Roses 
The damage was repaired in 1409, and by the mid-fifteenth century had come into the possession of the Duchy of Lancaster. Its custodian was Gruffudd ap Nicolas. During the Wars of the Roses, Carreg Cennen became a Lancastrian stronghold. The Yorkist victory at the Battle of Mortimer's Cross in 1461 forced Gruffudd's sons to surrender the castle. The Yorkists subsequently set about demolishing (slighting) it with a team of 500 men.

Recent history 
Ownership of the castle passed to the Vaughan and Cawdor families, and from the 18th century it started to attract artists. J. M. W. Turner painted the castle in 1798. The second Earl Cawdor began an extensive renovation in the 19th century, and in 1932 Carreg Cennen was given to the guardianship of the Office of Works. In the 1960s Carreg Cennen Castle was acquired by the Morris family of Castell Farm, when Lord Cawdor's legal team made a mistake in the wording of the deeds and included the castle as part of the farm. Today, the castle remains privately owned by Margaret and Bernard Llewellyn, daughter and son in law of the late Mr. Gwilim Morris. The castle is now maintained by Cadw. It is open daily from 9.30am to 5.00pm between April and October and 9.30 to 4.30pm between November and March (closed Christmas Day).

Gallery

See also
Castles in Great Britain and Ireland
List of Cadw properties
List of castles in Wales
The Gauntlet, a children's historical novel set at Carreg Cennen Castle

References

Bibliography

External links

Cadw - Castell Carreg Cennen

Castles in Carmarthenshire
Castle ruins in Wales
Grade I listed buildings in Carmarthenshire
Grade I listed castles in Wales